A Massachusetts general election was held on November 3, 1998 in the Commonwealth of Massachusetts.

The election included:
 statewide elections for governor, lieutenant governor, attorney general, Secretary of the Commonwealth, treasurer, and auditor;
 district elections for U.S. Representatives, State Representatives, State Senators, and Governor's Councillors; and
 ballot questions at the state and local levels.

Democratic and Republican candidates were selected in party primaries held September 15, 1998.

Governor & Lieutenant Governor

Republicans Paul Cellucci and Jane M. Swift were elected Governor and Lieutenant Governor, respectively, over Democratic candidates Scott Harshbarger and Warren Tolman, and Libertarian candidates Dean Cook and Eli Israel.

Attorney General
Incumbent Attorney General Scott Harshbarger did not run for re-election. Middlesex County District Attorney Thomas Reilly defeated State Senator Lois Pines in the Democratic primary and Middlesex County Sheriff Brad Bailey in the general election.

Democratic primary

Candidates
Lois Pines, State Senator from Newton 
Thomas Reilly, Middlesex County District Attorney

Results

General election

Secretary of the Commonwealth
Democrat William F. Galvin was re-elected Secretary of the Commonwealth. He defeated Republican Dale C. Jenkins and Libertarian David Atkinson in the general election.

Treasurer and Receiver-General
Incumbent Treasurer and Receiver-General Joe Malone did not run for re-election. Former State Representative Shannon P. O'Brien defeated Republican Robert Maginn and Libertarian Merton B. Baker in the general election.

Auditor
Democrat A. Joseph DeNucci was re-elected Auditor. He defeated Republican Michael Duffy and Libertarian Carla Howell.

U.S. House of Representatives

State Senate

State House of Representatives

Governor's Council

Ballot questions
There were four statewide ballot questions, which the Massachusetts voters voted on this election. All were approved. There were also various local ballot questions around the state.

Statewide Questions:
Question 1 - Administration of government. A constitutional amendment that would prevent the legislature from altering its own base pay. 
Question 2 - Elections and campaigns. A law that would create a new state agency would fund campaigns for all state offices.
Question 3 - Taxes. A law that would cut the state income tax rate on interest and dividend income. 
Question 4 - Business Regulation. A law that, starting in March 1998 would allow customers to choose to buy power from separate generating companies, instead of buying power from the utility that owns the power lines.

References

External links
 

 
Massachusetts